Talkspace is an online and mobile therapy company based in New York City. It was founded by Oren and Roni Frank in 2012. Talkspace users have access to licensed therapists through the website or mobile app on iOS and Android. 	Talkspace has made questionable claims about its effectiveness, compromised user privacy, posted fake reviews to improve its rating in an app store, and uses freelance therapists of uncertain qualifications.

History 
Talkspace was founded in 2012 by Roni and Oren Frank. The company was conceived after a transformative experience in couples therapy that saved their marriage. The results of psychotherapy were so meaningful for Roni Frank that, wanting to share it with others, she chose to pursue a master's degree in psychoanalysis and psychotherapy.

Talkspace began as a group therapy platform, but has evolved to a company offering online psychotherapy from licensed therapists. Talkspace introduced Unlimited Messaging Therapy in 2014, providing users text messaging with a therapist on the Talkspace website or mobile app. Clients and therapists can also send audio and video messages on the platform or schedule live video sessions.

In February 2015, the therapy platform was expanded to include couples therapy. As of July 2016, real-time voice and video calls are available during therapy sessions.

In May 2015, Talkspace raised $9.5 million from Spark Capital and SoftBank. In June 2016, the company raised $15 million from Norwest Venture Partners.

In addition to reporting on a nationwide uptick in demand for psychotherapy, Talkspace saw requests for therapy appointments triple in the wake of the 2016 presidential election, with increases seen across demographic groups, but were particularly high for minorities. According to a study conducted in partnership with HealthMap researchers at Boston Children's Hospital, a quarter of Talkspace users polled reported feeling “very stressed.” In 2018, Talkspace hired Neil Leibowitz, MD, JD, as its Chief Medical Officer.

In September 2017, the company raised $31 million from a Series C round led by Qumra Capital. In August 2019, the company raised $50 million Series D funding and entered into a partnership with Optum.

Talkspace saw a significant uptick in demand for psychotherapy during the COVID-19 pandemic, attributed to both the increased emotional toll of the pandemic and the restrictions put in place on people's physical movements. The company offered a free month of online therapy services to medical workers during the pandemic.

In May 2020, Cigna added Talkspace virtual therapy services to the company's telehealth offerings.

In November 2021, the Chief Operating Officer, CEO, and head of clinical services all resigned within a span of weeks. The company disclosed that some of the resignations were in connection to an offsite company events. Shareholder rights law firms announced investigations that the company's former leadership violated securities law.

Product 
Talkspace provides psychotherapy via smartphone, tablet, or desktop where users over the age of 13 can get help from a licensed therapist. Talkspace is a monthly subscriptions service with prices starting at US$260 per month. The platform allows users to communicate with their therapist via video, audio, and text messaging. Depending on the plan, users may also have access to a number of 30-minute video conference session per month.

Based on initial information provided, clients are paired with a psychotherapist by an intake specialist or can select one from several suggested by a matching algorithm. Therapeutic approaches offered by therapists include Cognitive Behavioral Therapy (CBT) and other evidence-based treatment options. Talkspace has grown to include over 1.5 million clients and includes therapists in all 50 states. The company uses machine learning and artificial intelligence tools to analyze anonymized transcripts of therapy sessions in order to improve services.

Talkspace is also HIPAA BAA compliant and uses encryption to maintain client confidentiality. All therapists are licensed and screening involves background-checks, technical training, and clinical interviews.

Lawsuit 
Following the resignation of its senior leadership team in 2021, a class action lawsuit alleging securities fraud was filed. The suit claimed that the company failed to disclose its declining user base and overvalued its accounts.

Criticism 
Psychologist Todd Essig has criticized Talkspace in four different articles for conflicting business and clinical interests, making scientific claims about its effectiveness, violating patient confidentiality, and other issues. In December, 2016, it was reported that Talkspace used faulty psychological practices, psychologists of uncertain qualifications, and a lack of regard for patient safety and confidentiality.

In 2018, the Psychotherapy Action Network (a therapist's advocacy organization) wrote a letter to the American Psychological Association and Michael Phelps calling attention to alleged concerns with the product. In response to the letter, the APA updated their policies to bar Talkspace from exhibiting at their conferences. Talkspace later filed a $40 million defamation lawsuit against the Psychotherapy Action Network. The lawsuit was dismissed in 2020.

In April 2020, The New York Times published an article where they cited Talkspace employees had read transcripts from therapy sessions and that employees were instructed by the company to post fake app store reviews using burner phones. The piece also detailed the experiences of Ricardo Lori, an employee that used the service, who was persuaded by a Talkspace executive to anonymously share his therapy chat logs for a company presentation but Lori soon discovered his identity was revealed.

See also 
 BetterHelp
 Telepsychiatry

References

American companies established in 2012
Companies based in New York City
Companies listed on the Nasdaq
Therapy
Telehealth